Éverton Barbosa da Hora or simply Éverton (born October 2, 1983 in Recife), is a Brazilian defensive midfielder. On August 17, 2008, his dismissal from Sport was announced. He is currently playing for Santa Cruz.

Honours
 Campeonato Pernambucano in 2006, 2007 and 2008 with Sport Club do Recife
 Copa do Brasil in 2008 with Sport Club do Recife

Contract

External links
 sambafoot
 CBF
 zerozero.pt

1983 births
Living people
Brazilian footballers
Sport Club do Recife players
Associação Atlética Ponte Preta players
Goiás Esporte Clube players
Sertãozinho Futebol Clube players
América Futebol Clube (RN) players
Clube Náutico Capibaribe players
Guaratinguetá Futebol players
Luverdense Esporte Clube players
Boa Esporte Clube players
Fortaleza Esporte Clube players
Association football midfielders
Sportspeople from Recife